İbaxlı (also, İsaxlı, Ibakhly, Isakly, and İsaqlı) is a village and municipality in the Qakh Rayon of Azerbaijan.  It has a population of 527.

References 

Populated places in Qakh District